John R. Hall may refer to:

 John Hall (American businessman), chairman and CEO of Ashland Inc.
 John Roulstone Hall (1826-1911), American architect
 John Hall (priest) (born 1949), English priest of the Church of England
 John R. Hall (author) (born 1975), American author and co-founder of Greenwood & Hall
 John Reeves Hall (died 2005), games programmer at Loki Software and Treyarch
John R. Hall (author, blogger, magician) (born 1958), founder of Hunting For Thompson.com and the author of Red, White, and the Blues.